Jesús Vidaña is a fisherman from Mexico. He, together with Lucio Rendón and Salvador Ordóñez, left a Mexican fishing port in October 2005 and survived nine months adrift in a fishing boat in the Pacific Ocean before being rescued in August 2006.

Lost at sea 

But they exhausted their fuel and strong easterly winds cast them adrift in the Northern Equatorial Current which crosses the Pacific Ocean from Mexico to the Philippines. Rendón's family searched for several weeks, but the castaways were blown out into the high seas too fast and could not be found. Without a radio, the fishermen had no way to raise help.

Surviving nine months adrift 
The three survived for nine months on raw fish, seagulls, and sea turtles and by collecting rain in empty gasoline containers. This was scarce during the first month, but with the onset of winter, successive cold fronts brought showers, enabling their survival. However, two other companions, including the vessel's owner, died from starvation after two months.

Sailing across the Pacific Ocean 
Although they thought they were drifting aimlessly, the survivors had followed exactly the same path that the Nao de China travelled in the 17th century from Acapulco to Manila. Hope returned to the stranded fishermen when they saw planes flying from the west. They realized that it would be easier to cross the ocean to the west, rather than attempting to turn into the wind to return to Mexico. They fashioned a sail with blankets and continued westwards, following the wind and the currents.

The men made fishing hooks with strings and wire from the engine, and caught turtles by diving into the ocean with a rope tied to their waists. They ate everything: meat, blood, bones, eggs, and so survived for nine months crossing two thirds of the Pacific Ocean (more than ) westwards.

Rescue at sea 
The captain ordered the crew to sail towards the signal to investigate, thinking the radar signal was too strong to be a group of sea gulls. The survivors were reported to be "very thin and hungry, but otherwise healthy". The sailors of the Taiwanese boat took them aboard and gave them food, medical care, and clothes and had them rest for the 13 days until they disembarked in Majuro, Marshall Islands, on 22 August 2006, where they were handed over to the local authorities and later to an official from the Mexican embassy in New Zealand, who arranged to have them flown back to Mexico.

Back home 
They arrived back in Mexico on 27 August 2006, and after visiting their families they went back to San Blas to continue with shark fishing.

Yumei Yoselyn, Jesús Vidaña's 21-year-old wife, was pregnant when her 27-year-old husband got lost at sea. She also had a four-year-old child. 
Some suspected that the fishermen were involved in drug-smuggling, which all of them adamantly denied. In Mexico shark-fishing permits are expensive, so small fishing boats that sail out into the sea to catch sharks often do not inform port authorities of their leaving.

See also
List of people who disappeared mysteriously at sea

References

Notes

From the Mexican newspaper La Jornada (in Spanish):
 La Jornada
 La Jornada
 La Jornada
Mexicans' 'nine-month' sea ordeal, 16 August 2006, BBC News

2000s missing person cases
Castaways
Fishers
Formerly missing people
Living people
Missing person cases in Mexico
People from Nayarit
Year of birth missing (living people)